Nashua Airport at Boire Field  is a public-use airport located three nautical miles (6 km) northwest of the central business district of Nashua, a city in Hillsborough County, New Hampshire, United States. Owned by the Nashua Airport Authority, It is included in the Federal Aviation Administration (FAA) National Plan of Integrated Airport Systems for 2017–2021, in which it is categorized as a national reliever airport facility.

History 
The airport dates back to 1934, when the city of Nashua bought a small existing airport, which lacked a hangar and had a grass runway. Over the next several years Nashua, with federal help, paved the  runway and put up some buildings. According to the history in the airport web site, the hangar was constructed from bricks reused from a Nashua factory that burned in 1930 in what was known here as the Crown Hill Fire.

In 1943 it was named Boire Field, after Ensign Paul Boire, who was Nashua's first casualty in World War II.

The Nashua Airport Authority was established to oversee the airport in 1961. The New England Aeronautical Institute was founded here in 1965. The NEAI's Daniel Webster Junior College division was founded in 1967. The two schools merged in 1978 to form the Daniel Webster College (DWC). Nashua Airport would become one of the busiest airports in New England in terms of take-offs and landings due to its use by DWC for flight training (the flight training program would eventually be shuttered in 2010).

The airport's control tower was built in 1972. The airport was one of the first to operate with a non-federal control tower in the early 1990s. This type of air traffic service, called a "contract tower", is common today.

The runway officially opened on August 31, 2012. The original runway was removed. Many taxiways to the new runway were rebuilt during the construction.

In 2016, Southern New Hampshire University (SNHU) agreed to absorb the DWC's faculty and academic programs after its parent company ITT Tech declared bankruptcy. SNHU placed the winning bid for DWC's flight center, tower building, and hangar, and is exploring the viability of reviving DWC's former flight training program.

Facilities and aircraft 

For the 12-month period ending December 31, 2011, the airport had 65,965 aircraft operations, an average of 180 per day: 99.7% general aviation, 0.3% air taxi, and <0.1% military. At that time there were 294 aircraft based at this airport: 81% single-engine, 9% multi-engine, 6% jet, 3% helicopter, and 1% glider.

There is space for 441 aircraft located on the field. Air Traffic Control is at the airport from 7 a.m. until 9 p.m. It has no scheduled commercial service.

Airport services 
The airport has private flight schools offering training and certification in fixed-wing airplanes and helicopters. On-demand air charter is offered by providers, including Air Direct Airways and Infinity Aviation, which operates a number of Hawker mid-sized business jet aircraft.

Infinity Aviation Services is a fixed-base operator (FBO) that provides aircraft servicing, fueling and maintenance and flight planning resources. GFW Aeroservices, a former FBO, ceased operation in March 2011.

The second-floor Midfield Cafe is open for breakfast and lunch from 7 a.m. to 2 p.m., six days a week, closed on Tuesdays.

The airport hosts the Southern New Hampshire University Aviation Center, Aviation Operations Management Program, and an accelerated Flight Program.

References

External links 
 Nashua Airport - Boire Field official site
 Infinity Aviation Services and Nashua Jet Aviation, the fixed-base operators (FBOs)
 New Hampshire Aviation Historical Society
 Aerial image as of April 1998 from USGS The National Map
 
 

Airports in New Hampshire
Airports established in 1934
Buildings and structures in Nashua, New Hampshire
Transportation buildings and structures in Hillsborough County, New Hampshire
1934 establishments in New Hampshire